Murder ballads are a subgenre of the traditional ballad form dealing with a crime or a gruesome death. Their lyrics form a narrative describing the events of a murder, often including the lead-up and/or aftermath. The term refers to the content, and may be applied to traditional ballads, part of oral culture.

Defining the subgenre
The term ballad, applied to traditional or folk music, means a narrative song. Within ballads, the "event song" is dedicated to narrating a particular event, and the murder ballad is a type of event song in which the event is a murder. This definition can be applied also to songs composed self-consciously within, or with reference to, the traditional generic conventions. Atkinson, referring to traditional English ballads, comments that "there is no shortage of murders in the corpus of ballads [...] and few of them are concealed with any success."

Perspectives are numerous. Some murder ballads tell the story from the point of view of the murderer, or attempt to portray the murderer in a somewhat sympathetic light, such as "Tom Dooley". A recording of that song sold nearly four million copies for The Kingston Trio in 1958. Other murder ballads tell the tale of the crime from the point of view of the victim, such as "Lord Randall", in which the narrator becomes ill and discovers that he has been poisoned. Others tell the story with greater distance, such as "Lamkin", which records the details of the crime and the punishment without any attempt to arouse sympathy for the criminal. Supernatural revenge wrought by the victim upon the murderer sometimes figures in murder ballads such as "The Twa Sisters" (also known as "Binnorie" or "Minnorie" Child Ballad #10).

Daniel A. Cohen comments that the murder ballad should be distinguished from a related genre, of "dying verses", intended for reading rather than singing, a New England tradition from the 18th century. Dying verses related to courtship murders came in with the 19th century.

History 
Murder ballads make up a notable portion of traditional ballads, many of which originated in Scandinavia, England, and lowland Scotland in the premodern era (suggesting an ultimate Germanic cultural origin). In those, while the murder is committed, the murderer usually suffers justice at the hands of the victim's family, even if the victim and murderer are related (see "Edward/Son David", "The Cruel Brother", and "The Two Sisters" for examples). In these ballads murderous women usually burn while males hang—see "Lamkin" and some Scottish versions of "The Two Sisters". Within the context of the British isles, murder ballads are only found in English and Scots-speaking regions (broadly, England, lowland Scotland, and northeastern Ireland), and are not a feature of Gaelic or Welsh-language music.

The details and locales for a particular murder ballad did change over time. For example, "Knoxville Girl" is essentially the same ballad as "The Wexford Girl" with the setting transposed from Ireland to Tennessee—the two of them are based on "The Oxford Girl", a murder ballad set in England. Many American murder ballads are modified versions of Old World ballads with any elements of supernatural retribution removed and the focus transferred to the slaughter of the innocent. For example, the English ballad "The Gosport Tragedy" of the 1750s had both murder and vengeance on the murderer by the ghosts of the murdered woman and her unborn baby, who call up a great storm to prevent his ship sailing before tearing him apart. In contrast, the Kentucky version, "Pretty Polly", is a stark and blood-soaked murder ballad with the victim being betrayed by the man she loves, stabbed in the heart, and buried in a shallow grave. The epilogue describes her killer being hanged by the community and his soul burning in hell and a "debt to the Devil" in a few versions.

African music traditions brought by slaves blended with the conventions. Olive Burt noted that the murder ballad tradition of the American Old West is distinct to some extent from that of ballads rooted in the old broadside tradition, noting that:

Western settlers found murder and bloodshed fascinating, and composed local ballads. But with printing facilities scarce, many of these items were not published at all while others saw fame only briefly in the columns of the local newspapers. As a result, true western ballads of murder—except those about such famous outlaws as Jesse James, Cole Younger, Sam Bass, and their ilk—have been entirely lost, or are known only to the children of those who knew and sang them. These children are now, of course, old men and women. Some of the best examples of western murder ballads will be lost forever when these people die.

Several historical murder ballads became hit pop songs in the 1950s and 1960s, including the Kingston Trio's "Tom Dooley" (as mentioned above), which was a #1 Billboard hit in 1958, Lloyd Price's version of "Stagger Lee" also reached the top of the chart in 1959, while Lefty Frizzell's "Long Black Veil" was a hit for a number of artists over the years.

Cultural references
Tom Lehrer's song, "The Irish Ballad", is a parody of the traditional murder ballad. J.H.P. Pafford, in a review of Olive Burt's American Murder Ballads and their Stories, states that the song contains "a running prose commentary on the incidents described in many [such] ballads".

Suzanne Collins's Hunger Games Trilogy of books, and the films based upon them, make much of Katniss Everdeen's ability to sing. "The Hanging Tree" was written specifically for the second film; it follows Appalachian murder ballad style.

List of murder ballads

See also
 List of songs about killers
 Narcocorrido
 Teenage tragedy song

References

Further reading

Further listening
 Blood Booze 'n Bones, Sung by Ed McCurdy, banjo accompaniment by Erik Darling, Elektra Records, 1956 (includes 12-page booklet).
 Bloody Ballads: Classic British and American Murder Ballads, Sung by Paul Clayton, Ed. by Kenneth S. Goldstein, Riverside Records, New York, 1956 (includes cover notes).

Ballads

Song forms
Folk music
19th century in music
20th century in music